The 1967 Blue Swords was an international senior-level figure skating competition organized in Karl-Marx-Stadt, East Germany. Medals were awarded in the disciplines of men's singles, ladies' singles, pair skating and ice dancing. East Germany's Günter Zöller outscored the Soviet Union's Vladimir Kurenbin for gold in the man's category. East Germans swept the ladies' podium, led by Beate Richter, who won her first gold medal at the event after three previous podium results. Soviet ice dancers Lyudmila Pakhomova / Aleksandr Gorshkov defeated the defending champions, Annerose Baier / Eberhard Rüger of East Germany, who had beaten them a year earlier.

Results

Men

Ladies

Pairs

Ice dancing 

Blue Swords
Blue Swords